El Capitan is a census-designated place in Gila County in the U.S. state of Arizona. The population as of the 2010 U.S. Census was 37.

Geography

Demographics

References

Census-designated places in Gila County, Arizona